Maqaduniya is a region in Medieval Egypt comprising Fustat, Ain Shams, Giza and Memphis.

Name 
It is unknown if Egyptian Maqaduniya is related to Balkan region of the same name. 

Yaqut al-Hamawi in his Kitāb Mu'jam al-Buldān says:"Maqaduniya is the name of Misr  in Ancient Greek." Paul Casanova connects Maqaduniya to one of the Ancient Egyptian names of Memphis – Makha-to-ui.

It could be also related to the name of Mokattam Hills which Casanova derives from a denomination of the compound Heliopolite deity (Hor)-em-akhet-Atum (Horus of the Horizon–Atum), the compound which is also present in one of the Sphinx's names – Harmachis ( Harmashi).

References 

Medieval Egypt
Historical regions